Višnjevac is a suburb of Osijek in Croatia. It is connected by the D2 highway. It is also connected by GPP bus line 1 and tram line 1. The population is 6,680.

References

Populated places in Osijek-Baranja County